Voice FM is a Community Radio Station that covers Southampton, England and the surrounding areas. Their main audience is students and take the style of contemporary hit radio, as well as showcasing homegrown talent.

Schedule 
The schedule for Voice FM takes a simple format - with the breakfast show kicking off each day between 7 a.m. and 10 a.m. (or 8-10 a.m. on weekends), followed by Paul Baker with the long running mid morning show between 10 a.m. and 12 p.m., and the DriveTime show from 4 p.m.

From 6pm, the shows turn specialist and move away from the contemporary pop. Within these hours the genres range from soul music to classic rock. Notable specialist shows include the Decades of Dance show, the Soul Train with Don Jon and the nightly Club Mix sessions.

The Breakfast Show heavily features that week's playlist, as well as two "Fresh" tracks and the "Homegrown Hit". The DriveTime Show follows the same format, but with more of an emphasis on street music. Paul Baker's mid morning show continues to play the most popular chart favourites along with features such as The Birthday File, the Brainbuster and On This Day In History. On The Saturday Breakfast Show presenters attempt to break World records and mock the "contemporary" playlist with their own "Guilty Pleasure of the Week" segment.

Notable presenters 
Ferry Corsten - Corsten's Countdown

References

Radio stations in Hampshire
Community radio stations in the United Kingdom